Ulrike Folkerts (born 14 May 1961 in Kassel, Hesse, Germany) is a German actress. She is most famous for playing police officer Lena Odenthal in the German crime television series Tatort. The episodes are located in the town of Ludwigshafen.

Folkerts, who is openly lesbian, participated in the Gay Games 2002 in Sydney and won a silver and bronze medal in the swimming relay. In the single competition she was disqualified because of a false start. In July 2004 she won a bronze medal at the EuroGames in München.

On the stage, in 2005 and 2006 she was the first woman to play Death in Jedermann, Hugo von Hofmannsthal's version of Everyman, at the Salzburg Festival.

Publications

In 2005, Folkerts published her first book, an autobiography. In October 2008 she published her second book: "Glück gefunden" (Happiness found)  together with her partner Katherina Schnitzler.

Awards 
 2001: Jugendhörbuchpreis
 2002: Publikums-Bambi – Hauptkommissarin Lena Odenthal
 2007: Verdienstkreuz am Bande
 2007: Courage-Preis for her work inter alia for burundikids e.V. and alliance Landmine.de

References

External links

Image of Folkerts at the Salzburg Festival 2006

1961 births
Living people
German stage actresses
German television actresses
German television personalities
Hochschule für Musik, Theater und Medien Hannover alumni
German lesbian actresses
Actors from Kassel
German LGBT sportspeople
Lesbian sportswomen
German female swimmers
20th-century German actresses
21st-century German actresses
Recipients of the Cross of the Order of Merit of the Federal Republic of Germany
LGBT swimmers
Südwestrundfunk people
Sportspeople from Kassel